Ivan Kostić (born 24 October 1995) is a Serbian football goalkeeper.

Club career

Timočanin
Born in Zaječar, Kostić passed throw through the Radnički Niš youth categories and later started his senior career with Timočanin in the 2013–14 season, making 7 appearances in the Serbian League East. He also continued playing with the club as a bonus player in the next season. In the winter break-off season, he was elected for the best sportsman of Knjaževac in 2014. Playing for Timočanin, Kostić made 40 appearances in the Serbian League East at total between 2013 and 2015.

Radnički Pirot
After he had been nominated for the man of the match played between Timočanin and Radnički Pirot in the first half of the 2015–16 Serbian League East season, Kostić moved to Pirot at the beginning of 2016 and signed with Radnički. Kostić made his official debut for new club in the 17 fixture match of the season against Dunav Prahovo, when he was substituted in after Ivan Bulajić got a red card. In the next fixture match, against Sloga Despotovac, Kostić made his first league start for Radnički Pirot. In the last fixture match of the season, against Car Konstantin, Kostić replaced Bulajić in second half. Saving a goal until the end of a game, he won the Serbian League East with Radnički Pirot and made promotion to the Serbian First League. Kostić also played several Pirot district and Southern and Eastern Serbia cup matches against Jedinstvo Pirot, Lužnica, Rudar Podvis, Radnički Svilajnac and Radan Lebane. After Ivan Bulajić earned an injury at the beginning of 2016–17 Serbian First League, Kostić became starting goalkeeper from the 3rd fixture match against Mačva Šabac. After two lost matches and 4 goals conceded, Kostić saved his goal on the next 9 matches, spending 841 minute without a conceded goal.

Metalac Gornji Milanovac
At the beginning of 2017, Kostić joined Metalac Gornji Milanovac.

Mladost Lučani
On 22 September 2021, he signed with Mladost Lučani.

Career statistics

Honours
Radnički Pirot
Serbian League East: 2015–16

References

1995 births
Living people
People from Zaječar
Association football goalkeepers
Serbian footballers
FK Timočanin players
FK Radnički Pirot players
FK Metalac Gornji Milanovac players
FK Radnik Surdulica players
FK Mladost Lučani players
Serbian First League players
Serbian SuperLiga players